Mesut Çaytemel (born 24 April 1984) is a Turkish professional footballer who plays as a leftback.

Professional career
Çaytemel began playing football in local clubs, and in various amateur teams in Turkey. He eventually worked his way up to the TFF First League, and transferred to Hatayspor in 2015. Çaytemel captained Hatayspor as they were promoted into the Süper Lig for the first time in their history in 2020. Çaytemel made his professional debut with Hatayspor in a 2–0 Süper Lig win over defending champions İstanbul Başakşehir on 14 September 2020, at the age of 36.

References

External links
 
 

1984 births
Sportspeople from Rize
Living people
Turkish footballers
Association football fullbacks
İnegölspor footballers
Antalyaspor footballers
Samsunspor footballers
Altay S.K. footballers
Giresunspor footballers
Boluspor footballers
Orduspor footballers
Hatayspor footballers
Süper Lig players
TFF First League players
TFF Second League players
TFF Third League players